Julie Hoyle (born 27 March 1938) is a British former swimmer. Hoyle competed in the women's 100 metre backstroke at the 1956 Summer Olympics. At the ASA National British Championships she won the 110 yards backstroke title in 1957.

References

1938 births
Living people
British female swimmers
Olympic swimmers of Great Britain
Swimmers at the 1956 Summer Olympics
British female backstroke swimmers